Gerardus "Gerard" Kamper (born 9 August 1950) is a retired Dutch cyclist. He was part of the Dutch team that shared fifth place in the 4 km team pursuit at the 1972 Summer Olympics. He finished 84th in the 1975 Tour de France. His son Kris also became professional cyclist.

See also
 List of Dutch Olympic cyclists

References

1950 births
Living people
Olympic cyclists of the Netherlands
Cyclists at the 1972 Summer Olympics
Dutch male cyclists
People from Langedijk
Cyclists from North Holland